José Sotero Vargas (1905 – death date unknown) was a Cuban outfielder in the Negro leagues in the 1930s and 1940s.

A native of Manzanillo, Cuba, Vargas made his Negro leagues debut in 1935 with the Cuban Stars (East). He went on to play for the New York Cubans in 1939 and 1944.

References

External links
 and Baseball-Reference Black Baseball stats and Seamheads

1905 births
Date of birth missing
Year of death missing
Place of death missing
Cuban Stars (East) players
New York Cubans players
Cuban baseball coaches
Baseball outfielders
People from Manzanillo, Cuba